Vanniyamparambil Joseph Mathews, popularly known as V. J. Mathews, is a Malayalam writer, Indian Air Force personnel and businessman from Kerala, India. He is the founder and Chairman of the Leetha Group of companies, established in Kalamasserry, Cochin, Kerala.

Career
Mathews started his own industrial packaging business named ‘Leetha Industries’ at Kalamassery with seven employees, and financial assistance from a bank. It grew to be a major industrial venture with four factories and 500 employees. He is the chairman of ‘Leetha Group’ consisting of Leetha Pack, Leetha Graphics, Leetha Press & Process  and a partnership concern, Leetha Industries, which is an export company in Kerala.

Writing
His first novel Adiyozhukkukal (1982) was serialized in Kerala Times. Current Books published Adiyozhukkukal in three editions. In 1983, a story named 'Maranathinte Manamulla Onasmarankal' received an award from Vanitha' Ten stories were published in various publications. He has published twenty five books, including three English books (The Upsurge, Untold Gospel, Devil and Deity.

Media reviews 
The New Indian Express reviewed The Upsurge on 22 January 2019.

The New Indian Express reviewed Untold Gospel on 30 March 2019.

The New Indian Express reviewed Devil & Deity on 1 May 2019.

See also
 List of Indian writers

References

1944 births
Living people
Businesspeople from Kerala
Indian Air Force personnel
Malayalam-language writers
Malayali people
People from Alappuzha district